The Amabile Choirs of London, Canada is a nonprofit organization with the purpose of bringing together young singers from London, Ontario and surrounding areas. They are "regarded as among the premiere choral ensembles for children and youth," according to The Canadian Encyclopedia, the national encyclopedia of Canada.

This family of choirs began in 1985 with John Barron and Brenda Zadorsky founding the Amabile Youth Singers, and has since grown to eight choirs under the direction of seven conductors. The Junior Amabile Singers followed in 1989, and the Amabile Boys Choirs were established in 1990.

Overview

Amabile for Girls and Women
There are five levels of choirs for girls and women within the Amabile organization. The Amabile Da Capo Choir is a training choir welcoming girls aged 8 to 11. The aim of Da Capo is to provide a choral venue for young choristers and serve as a training choir for the Junior Amabile Singers. Da Capo performs as guests of the more senior Amabile Choirs throughout the season under the direction of Jacquelyn Norman and Wendy Landon. The Junior Amabile Singers (JAS) is an all-female choir for singers aged 9 to 14. The JAS are under the direction of Jacquelyn Norman and Wendy Landon. The Amabile Youth Singers (AYS) is an all-female choir featuring singers who range in age from 13 to 22. Both the AYS and the Women's Ensemble are under the direction of Brenda Zadorsky. Prima is the women's choir, open to adult women (over 18), who have highly experienced vocal skills and wish to work on advanced repertoire. On occasion, the AYS and Prima will perform together as the Amabile Young Women's Ensemble (AYWE).

Amabile for Boys and Men
There are five levels of choirs for boys and men within the Amabile organization. The boys' and men's choirs are under the artistic direction of Dr. Carol Beynon and Ken Fleet, with the assistance of Don Sills and Jeff Beynon who work with the TTC and the TCC. The Treble Training Choir (TTC) is a training choir welcoming boys ages 8 and up. For many younger boys who audition, this is their first experience with choral singing. The Treble Concert Choir (TCC) is an all-boy choir for unchanged voices. Boys aged 8 and above with experience singing may audition for this choir but most become part of the training choir first, for one or two years, before joining this group. The Amabile Young Men's Ensemble (YM) is an all-male choir for changed voices, made up primarily of young men of high school age. Primus is the men's ensemble and is made up of adult men (over 18) with advanced vocal skills. Primus is pronounced PREE-moose. Quite often, the Young Men and Primus perform together as the Amabile Young Men's Ensemble (AYME).

Guest conductors
The choirs brings guest conductors and composers each year many who are renowned such as Francisco Núñez and Bob Chilcott.

Achievements
The Amabile choirs have been "much decorated" at international choral competitions. They are "regarded as among the premiere choral ensembles for children and youth." 

The choir marked it's 35th anniversary with a music video as noted by CTV News. Due to COVID restrictions, the choir recorded its annual Christmas concert in a parking garage, as noted by CBC.ca.

 The Junior Amabile Singers competed in the 2012 Golden Gate International Children's and Youth Choirs Festival in Berkeley California. They were awarded first place in the Children's Folk Music Category and second in the Children's Historical Music Class. The choir previously earned gold medals in the 1st Choir Olympics, Linz Austria and 3rd Choir Olympics, Bremen Germany.
 They performed at Victoria Park during the welcome ceremony for the Olympic Torch in 2010.
 In 2010 the Jack Richardson Music Awards steering committee inducted them into the London Music Hall of Fame.
 Amabile Choirs Youth Singers won the 1986 CBC Choral Competition, and second place at the International Koorfestival in the Netherlands in 1987.

References

External links
 

1985 establishments in Ontario
Musical groups established in 1985
Musical groups from London, Ontario
Canadian choirs
Organizations based in London, Ontario
Charities based in Canada
Boys' and men's choirs
Girls' and women's choirs
Community choirs
Choral societies